The list below provides a comprehensive overview of companies that develop and fabricate MEMS (microelectromechanical systems) devices. These companies are usually referred to the concept of foundries. The offer of the companies varies according to the used material, the production volume and the size of the wafers used for the fabrication. The attribute type is for Integrated Device Manufacturer, Pure-play or Research Institute business model.

Microelectronic and microelectromechanical systems
MEMS foundries